Afkasht (also Romanized as Āfḵasht) is a village in Fasharud Rural District, in the Central District of Birjand County, South Khorasan Province, Iran. At the 2006 census, its population was 170, in 39 families.

References 

Populated places in Birjand County